Christopher Andrew March (February 25, 1963 – September 5, 2019) was an American fashion and costume designer, best known for his appearance as a contestant on season 4 (2007–2008) of Bravo's Project Runway.

He was also on season 4 (2014–2015) of Project Runway All Stars, finishing in 4th place. Additionally, he competed in the one-shot special Project Runway: All-Star Challenge (2009), and was the third runner-up.

Career 

Born on February 25, 1963, March was originally from Alameda, California, where he worked as a costume designer for the Long-running musical revue, Beach Blanket Babylon. During the fourth season finale of Project Runway, March, who had become popular with avant-garde creations, gained notoriety when he showcased human hair on his designs. In the end, however, he was eliminated from showcasing at Bryant Park during New York Fashion Week. His client list included Madonna, Cirque du Soleil, Prince, Beyoncé Knowles (he constructed the costumes for her I Am... Tour), Lady Gaga, Thierry Mugler and Meryl Streep. His costuming efforts were recognized with a Drama Desk Award nomination in 2002 for Christmas With the Crawfords.

March resided in New York City and appeared on several episodes of The Real Housewives of New York City as a friend of Sonja Morgan.

March starred on a show about his work as a costume designer, entitled Mad Fashion, which premiered on the Bravo Network on October 4, 2011. Mad Fashion ran for ten episodes.

Accident and death
In June 2017, March fell and hit his head in his apartment. After lying unconscious for four days, he woke up and was able to call 911 after which he was rushed to the hospital. After his admission, staff were forced to put him into a medically induced coma for the next two months. Upon being re-awoken, March discovered that he'd lost functionality in both legs as well as in his right hand and arm.

Subsequently he returned to his home state of California and was admitted into a long-term care facility in Stockton, California in hopes of recovering, in which he'd continued designing dresses up until the very end.

On Thursday September 5, 2019, Chris March died in the care facility at 1:45 PM of a heart attack.

See also 

 List of fashion designers

References

External links 

1963 births
2019 deaths
People from Alameda, California
American fashion designers
LGBT fashion designers
Project Runway (American series) participants
21st-century LGBT people